are a group of three Japanese Shinto shrines connected with the Seiwa Genji group (the descent from Emperor Seiwa) of the Minamoto clan.

 Rokusonnō Shrine, Minami-ku, Kyoto, Kyoto Prefecture
 Tada Jinja, Kawanishi, Hyōgo Prefecture
 Tsuboi Hachimangū, Habikino, Osaka Prefecture

External links
 Official site of Rokusonnō Shrine
 Official site of Tada Shrine
 Official site of Tsuboi Hachimangu

Minamoto clan
Shinto shrines in Japan